Union Station, Union Terminal, Union Depot, or Union Passenger Station may refer to:

 Union station, a railroad station used by more than one railroad company, line, or service provider

Railway stations

Australia
 Union railway station, Melbourne, Victoria

Canada
 Union Station (Toronto), Ontario
 Union station (TTC), subway station in Toronto, Ontario
 Union Station (Winnipeg), Manitoba
 Union Station of Ottawa, Ontario, 1912-1966, today the Senate of Canada Building

United States

Alabama 
 Montgomery Union Station

Arizona 
 Union Station (Phoenix, Arizona)

Arkansas 
 Brinkley Union Station, in the Lick Skillet Railroad Work Station Historic District
 Little Rock Union Station
 Union Station (Pine Bluff, Arkansas), also known as the Pine Bluff-Jefferson County Historical Museum
 Texarkana Union Station

California 
 Union Station (Los Angeles)
 Santa Fe Depot (San Diego)

Colorado 
 Union Depot (Pueblo, Colorado)
 Denver Union Station

Connecticut 
 Hartford Union Station
 New London Union Station
 Canaan Union Depot
 Union Station (Danbury, Connecticut), now the Danbury Railway Museum
 Union Station (New Haven)
 Waterbury Union Station

Florida 
 Jacksonville Union Station
 Ocala Union Station
 Tampa Union Station

Georgia 
 Union Station (Albany, Georgia)
 Atlanta Union Station (1930)
 Augusta Union Station
 Union Station (Columbus, Georgia)
 Savannah Union Station

Illinois 
 Chicago Union Station, Illinois
 Englewood station (Chicago), or Englewood Union Station
 Joliet Union Station
 Peoria Union Station
 Springfield Union Station (Illinois)
 Watseka Union Depot
 Wells Street Station or Galena and Chicago Union Railroad Depot, Chicago

Indiana 
 Indianapolis Union Station
 Muncie Union Station
 Union Station (Gary, Indiana)
 Union Station (South Bend, Indiana)
 Terre Haute Union Station

Iowa 
 Cedar Rapids Union Station
 Iowa Falls Union Depot
 Union Station (Davenport, Iowa)

Kansas 
 Union Station (Wichita, Kansas)

Kentucky 
 Union Station (Louisville)
 Union Station (Owensboro, Kentucky)
 Lexington Union Station

Louisiana 
 New Orleans Union Passenger Terminal
 New Orleans Union Station
 Shreveport Union Station

Maine 
 Bangor Union Station
 Union Station (Portland, Maine)

Maryland 
 Pennsylvania Station (Baltimore), originally called Union Station
 Union Station (Salisbury, Maryland)

Massachusetts 
 North Station, Boston
 South Station (originally called South Union Station), Boston
 Union Station (Clinton, Massachusetts)
 Union Station (Northampton, Massachusetts)
 Union Station (Palmer, Massachusetts)
 Union Station, two Pittsfield predecessors to Joseph Scelsi Intermodal Transportation Center
 Springfield Union Station (Massachusetts)
 Union Station, predecessor to South Sudbury station
 Union Station (Walpole, Massachusetts)
 West Concord station, formerly called Union Station
 Union Station (Worcester, Massachusetts)

Michigan 
 Durand Union Station
 Fort Street Union Depot, Detroit
 Grand Rapids Union Station
 Holly Union Depot, Oakland County
 Union Depot (Lansing, Michigan)
 Union Depot (Muskegon, Michigan)

Minnesota 
 Duluth Depot, Minnesota
 Saint Paul Union Depot, Minnesota

Mississippi 
 Godbold Transportation Center, Brookhaven
 Gulfport station
 Union Station (Jackson, Mississippi)
 Union Station (Meridian, Mississippi)
 Union Station Historic District, Meridian

Missouri 
 Joplin Union Depot
 Union Station (St. Louis)
 Kansas City Union Station
 Union Station (MetroLink), St. Louis

Nebraska 
 Union Station (Omaha)

New Hampshire
 Union Station (Manchester, New Hampshire)

New Jersey 
 Phillipsburg Union Station
 Union station (NJ Transit), Union, New Jersey

New York 
 Union Station (Albany, New York)
 Union Station (Chatham, New York)
 Union Station (Lockport, New York)
 Union Station (Troy, New York)
 Union Station (Utica, New York)

North Carolina 
 Apex Union Depot
 Goldsboro Union Station
 Selma Union Depot
 Raleigh Union Station
 Union Station (Wilmington, North Carolina)
 Union Station (Winston-Salem, North Carolina)

Ohio 
 Akron Union Station
 Berea Union Depot
 Cincinnati Union Terminal
 Cleveland Union Depot
 Union Station (Columbus, Ohio)
 Dayton Union Station
 Marion Union Station
 Martin Luther King Jr. Plaza (Toledo)
 Tower City Center (formerly Cleveland Union Terminal)

Oklahoma 
 Union Station (Oklahoma City)
 Tulsa Union Depot

Oregon 
 Portland Union Station

Pennsylvania 
 Bethlehem Union Station
 Connellsville Union Passenger Depot
 Union Station (Erie, Pennsylvania)
 Union Station (Pittsburgh)

Rhode Island 
 Union Station (Providence)

South Carolina 
 North Charleston station
 Union Station (Columbia, South Carolina)
 Spartanburg station

Tennessee 
 Memphis Union Station
 Union Station (Chattanooga)
 Union Station (Columbia, Tennessee)
 Union Station, former station in Jackson
 Union Station (Nashville)

Texas 
 Galveston Railroad Museum (formerly Union Station), Galveston
 Union Depot (El Paso)
 Dallas Union Station
 Gulf, Colorado and Santa Fe Railroad Passenger Station, Fort Worth
 Union Station (Houston)
 Texarkana Union Station

Utah 
 Salt Lake City Union Pacific Depot
 Union Station (Ogden, Utah)

Vermont 
 White River Junction station, a union station
 Union Station (Brattleboro, Vermont)
 Union Station (Burlington, Vermont)

Virginia 
 Alexandria Union Station
 Broad Street Station (Richmond), or Union Station, Virginia
 Charlottesville Union Station
 Union Station (Petersburg)

Washington 
 Centralia station (Washington)
 Union Station (Seattle)
 Union Station (Tacoma, Washington)
 Union Station/South 19th Street station, Tacoma

Washington, D.C. 
 Washington Union Station
 Union Station (Washington Metro)
 Union Station (DC Streetcar)

Wisconsin 
 Ashland Union Station
 Everett Street Depot
 Superior Union Station

United Arab Emirates 
 Union (Dubai Metro), on the red and green lines

Art, entertainment, and media
 Union Station (band), a country music/bluegrass band
 Union Depot (film), 1932
 Union Station (film), 1950
 Union Station (mural), a public artwork in Columbus, Ohio, US

Communities and districts
 Union Station, Denver, a downtown neighborhood of Denver, Colorado
 Union Station, Ohio, an unincorporated community
 Union Station (electoral district), in Winnipeg, Manitoba

Enterprises
 Old Union Depot Hotel, Tampa, Florida
 Union Station (Shannon Mall), a shopping mall in Union City, Georgia
 Union Station School, Paducah, Kentucky

See also
14th Street–Union Square (New York City Subway)
Union Pacific Station (disambiguation) covering places named Union Pacific Depot, etc.
Central Station (disambiguation)